Pietro Conti was an Italian politician who served as 1st President of Umbria.

Personal life 
He was born on 8 September 1928 in Spoleto and died on 7 September 1988.

Honors 

Regional Museum of Emigration Pietro Conti is dedicated to him
Pietro Conti Prize is named after him

References 

1928 births
1988 deaths
Politicians of Umbria
Presidents of Umbria